Aplysia extraordinaria, common name the "extraordinary sea hare", is a very large species of sea slug, more specifically a sea hare, a marine opisthobranch gastropod mollusk in the family Aplysiidae, the sea hares.

References

 Bebbington A. (1977) Aplysiid species from Eastern Australia with notes on the Pacific Ocean Aplysiomorpha (Gastropoda, Opisthobranchia). Transactions of the Zoological Society of London 34: 87-147
 Spencer, H.G., Marshall, B.A. & Willan, R.C. (2009). Checklist of New Zealand living Mollusca. Pp 196-219. in: Gordon, D.P. (ed.) New Zealand inventory of biodiversity. Volume one. Kingdom Animalia: Radiata, Lophotrochozoa, Deuterostomia. Canterbury University Press, Christchurch

Further reading
 Hamatani I. & Baba, K. (2003). "A New Record of Aplysia (Varria) extraordinaria (Allan, 1932) (Opisthobranchia: Anaspidea) from Suruga Bay, Japan".

External links
  Spencer H.G., Willan R.C., Marshall B.A. & Murray T.J. (2011). Checklist of the Recent Mollusca Recorded from the New Zealand Exclusive Economic Zone
  Nimbs M. J., Willan R. C. & Smith S. D. A. (2017). Is Port Stephens, eastern Australia, a global hotspot for biodiversity of Aplysiidae (Gastropoda: Heterobranchia)?. Molluscan Research. 37(1): 47-65

extraordinaria
Gastropods described in 1932